The Northern Illinois-Iowa Conference (NIIC) was a college athletic conference affiliated with the National Collegiate Athletic Association (NCAA) at the Division III level. The conference was formed in 1969. Member institutions were located in the Midwestern United States in the states of Illinois and Iowa. After the 2005–06 academic year, the NIIC merged with the Lake Michigan Conference to form a new league called the Northern Athletics Conference (now known as the Northern Athletics Collegiate Conference).

Member schools

Final members

Notes

Former members

Notes

References

Defunct NCAA Division III conferences

Sports organizations established in 1969